Dzhavankent (Cavangent) is a rural locality (a selo) in Kayakentsky District, Republic of Dagestan, Russia. The population was 1,011 as of 2010. There are 21 streets.

Geography 
Dzhavankent is located 31 km southwest of Novokayakent (the district's administrative centre) by road. Kapkaykent and Bashlykent are the nearest rural localities.

Nationalities 
Kumyks live there.

References 

Rural localities in Kayakentsky District